Mark Leiter is Chairman of Leiter & Company. He was previously Chief Strategy Officer at  Nielsen. Prior to serving as Chief Strategy Officer, he served as Nielsen's Global President of Practices and Consulting Services. Earlier in his career, he was with McKinsey & Company where he was a founder of McKinsey's Business-to-Business marketing and Branding practices, and author of several McKinsey Quarterly articles.

He is the founder and former Chairman of the Board of Directors of The Demand Institute. He is a member of The Global Counsellors and the Global Advisory Board of The Conference Board, and serves as a trustee of Committee for Economic Development (CED). He serves on the board of directors of the VH1 Save the Music Foundation and InMoment, and as a Partner of Pereg Ventures, a venture capital firm based in NYC.

References

External links
Mark Leiter biodata
The Demand Institute
Pereg Ventures
The Conference Board's Global Counsellors
The Committee for Economic Development
The VH1 Save the Music Foundation
InMoment

Living people
American businesspeople
McKinsey & Company people
Year of birth missing (living people)
University at Albany, SUNY alumni
Harvard University alumni